The term rope trick may refer to:
 Magic trick, any trick involving a rope
 Indian rope trick, a trick involving causing a rope to appear to levitate in the air and then climbing up it
 Nylon rope trick, a demonstration of the chemical principles of step-growth polymerization
 Rope trick effect, in physics, seen in photographs of nuclear explosions when there are ropes attached to the exploding object
 Trick roping, in western arts or wild west shows